The National Museum of Brazil collections include an exhibition of funerary steles from ancient Egypt.

The current status of the collection is unknown after the fire that destroyed the museum in 2018.

References 

 
2nd-millennium BC steles
Ancient Egyptian stelas